Xylariopsis esakii is a species of beetle in the family Cerambycidae. It was described by Mitono in 1943. It is known from Taiwan.

References

Apomecynini
Beetles described in 1943